Park Do-yeong (Hangul: 박도영, born 30 January 1993) is a South Korean speed skater. She represented her country at the 2010 Winter Olympics in Vancouver, where she finished 27th in the 3000 m event.

Personal records

References

1993 births
Living people
South Korean female speed skaters
Speed skaters at the 2010 Winter Olympics
Olympic speed skaters of South Korea
Speed skaters at the 2011 Asian Winter Games
Speed skaters at the 2017 Asian Winter Games
Asian Games medalists in speed skating
Place of birth missing (living people)
Asian Games gold medalists for South Korea
Asian Games silver medalists for South Korea
Medalists at the 2011 Asian Winter Games
Universiade medalists in speed skating
Universiade bronze medalists for South Korea
Competitors at the 2013 Winter Universiade
21st-century South Korean women